First Church of Deliverance is a landmark Spiritual church located at 4315 South Wabash Avenue in Chicago, Illinois, in the United States. First Church of Deliverance was founded by Reverend Clarence H. Cobbs on May 8, 1929.  The church began with nine members and held its first service in the basement of his mother's home located in the Bronzeville area on the south side of Chicago. The church was built in 1939 by Walter T. Bailey, and two towers were added to it in 1946 by Kocher, Buss & DeKlerk. It is a rare example of the Streamline Moderne design being used for a house of worship, and was designated a Chicago Landmark on October 5, 1994.

Notes

External links
 
 

Streamline Moderne architecture in Illinois
Churches completed in 1939
20th-century churches in the United States
Churches in Chicago
Chicago Landmarks